Pseudopanax colensoi is a species of evergreen plant. This species is native to New Zealand. An example occurrence in central Westland podocarp/broadleaf forests includes flora associates such as Cyathea smithii and Dicksonia squarrosa, Rumohra adiantiformis, Ascarina lucida, Pseudowintera colorata and Blechnum discolor. The maximum height of this plant is 5 meters and it is the preferred food of possums.

References
 C. Michael Hogan. 2009. Crown Fern: Blechnum discolor, Globaltwitcher.com, ed. N. Stromberg
 Peter Wardle. 1991. Vegetation of New Zealand, Published by CUP Archive, 672 pages

Line notes

colensoi
Flora of New Zealand